Ahmet Serhat Hacıpaşalıoğlu (born October 24, 1964), known as Serhat, is a Turkish singer, songwriter, composer, producer and television presenter.

Born and raised in Istanbul, Serhat started his producing career by establishing his own company in 1994, End Productions. In the same year, he also started to produce and host a quiz show on TRT called Riziko! (Turkish version of the American quiz show Jeopardy!). In 1997, with his first single, "Rüya-Ben Bir Daha", his musical career began. Beside his other hosting and producing works, he continued his musical career and released "Total Disguise" (duet with Viktor Lazlo) in 2004, "Chocolate Flavour" in 2005, "I Was So Lonely", "No No Never (Moscow-Istanbul)" and "Ya + Ti" (Russian version of "Total Disguise", all of three songs were duets with Tamara Gverdtsiteli) in 2008 and "Je m'adore" in 2014.

He represented San Marino in the Eurovision Song Contest 2016 in Stockholm singing "I Didn't Know" on May 10, 2016 in the first semi final of Eurovision, but failed to qualify for the final. In 2017, the disco version of the song featuring Martha Wash was released. This version reached to the 25th place on Dance Club Songs chart by making Serhat the first Turkish singer that appeared on the chart. In 2018, a new version of "Total Disguise" featuring Elena Paparizou was released. He represented San Marino, for the second time in the Eurovision Song Contest 2019 in Tel Aviv with "Say Na Na Na". He performed in the first semi final and qualified for the final by placing 8th. In the final, he placed 19th, the best result in Sammarinese Eurovision Song Contest history. A German-language version of the song "Sing Na Na Na" was released in 2019, and the Spanish-language version "Di Na Na Na" in 2020.

Early years and education 
Serhat was born on October 24, 1964 in İstanbul, Turkey. His father, İsmail Hakkı, was a naval officer who was born in Trabzon where his mother was born, too. He attended a primary school in İcadiye, Üsküdar, and then Deutsche Schule Istanbul (German High School) in Beyoğlu, Istanbul. He graduated from Faculty of Dentistry of Istanbul University in 1988. In 1990, he completed two months of compulsory military service in Burdur.

Career

Television and events 
In 1994, Serhat established his own production company, End Productions. After an agreement with TRT, the company became the producer of the quiz show named Riziko!, Turkish version of the American quiz show Jeopardy!. Serhat was also the host of the show that started to air on October 3, 1994. In 1995, he received two Golden Butterfly (Turkish: Altın Kelebek) awards, one for "Best Male Host of the Year" and one for "Best Quiz Show of the Year" for Riziko!. In 1996 he again received the award for "Best Quiz Show of the Year". The show lasted over 430 episodes and ended at the end of 1996. A game show named Hedef 4 (Turkish version of Connect Four) that started to air on TRT 1 in 1996, was produced by End Productions. In 1997, he started to produce the game show Altına Hücum (Turkish version of Midas Touch) for Kanal 6 which ended after 72 episodes in the same year. In 1998, Riziko! returned to television and was aired on Kanal 7 hosted by Serhat. In the same year, Hedef 4 started to air on Kanal 7, too and ended the following year. Riziko! ended in 1999 and in the same year, Serhat started to host a talk entertainment on Kanal 7 named Serhat'la Rizikosuz which ended after six episodes. After a few months, Riziko! returned to Kanal 7 in 2000 and was continued 65 episodes. In September 2005, Serhat co-hosted Show TV's Kalimerhaba with Katerina Moutsatsou, a TV show which was produced by End Productions. At the end of 2009, Serhat created a dance orchestra "Caprice the Show" with 18 musicians and made numerous performances in the following years.

With his company, he also organizes some annual events such as the High School Music Contest (Liselerarası Müzik Yarışması, 1998–present), the Megahit-International Mediterranean Song Contest (Megahit-Uluslararası Akdeniz Şarkı Yarışması, 2002-2004) and the Dance Marathon (Dans Maratonu, dance competition between high schools and universities separately, 2009–present).

Production credits

Musical career 

He started his musical career 1997, with a single of two songs "Rüya" and "Ben Bir Daha". In 2004, he released his second single named "Total Disguise" with the French singer Viktor Lazlo in duet. Lyrics and music of the song were written by Olcayto Ahmet Tuğsuz and the song was performed both in English and French. The single also contained several remix versions of the song. In 2005, he recorded "Chocolate Flavour" and the song was released with "Total Disguise" as a single in Greece. In 2008, he collaborated with Russian/Georgian singer Tamara Gverdtsiteli and they recorded "I Was So Lonely", "No No Never (Moscow-Istanbul)" and "Ya + Ti" (Russian version of "Total Disguise"). These songs were released as a single and also appeared in Gverdtsiteli's album Vozdushiy Potsyelui (2008).

In 2014, Serhat started to work in France and Germany. He released his fifth single, a French song called "Je m'adore" with the music video directed by Thierry Vergnes shot in Paris. It reached number 1 for 5 weeks in a row on Deutsche DJ Black/Pop Charts, number 1 on Black 30, number 2 on British Dance Charts, number 8 on French Dance Charts and number 9 on Swiss Dance Charts.

On January 12, 2016, San Marino RTV announced that Serhat would represent San Marino in the Eurovision Song Contest 2016 in Stockholm. On March 9, 2016, the song that he performed in the contest, "I Didn't Know" was released. He performed in the first semi-final on May 10 and failed to qualify to final, ending in 12th place. On November 2, 2017, the disco version of "I Didn't Know" featuring Martha Wash that was re-arranged by the Swedish musician Johan Bejerholm was released as a single, along with a new music video. The song entered from the 47th place to the Dance Club Songs chart of the United States, and reached to its peak position, the 25th place on its fourth week in the chart. Thus, Serhat became the first Turkish singer that appeared in the chart. A new version of "Total Disguise" featuring Elena Paparizou was released on June 22, 2018 by CAP-Sounds. The music video of the single was released on September 14.

On January 21, 2019, San Marino RTV announced that he would again represent San Marino in the Eurovision Song Contest 2019 in Tel Aviv. On the same day, Serhat announced that he had been working on his first studio album, which was released in April 2019. The song that he performed in the contest, "Say Na Na Na", was released with an accompanying music video on March 7. He performed in the first semi final on May 14, 2019 and qualified for the final, where he finished 19th, setting the record for the highest placing San Marinese song in Eurovision history. This was only the second time San Marino had qualified for a Eurovision final, and the first time since 2014. On July 19, 2019, a German cover version of "Say Na Na Na" titled "Sing Na Na Na" was released by Serhat. It was accompanied by a remade version of the music video of "Say Na Na Na" released the same day. The Spanish cover version of the song, "Di Na Na Na" was released on October 16, 2020. The lyrics were translated to Spanish by Adolfo Caiman and the animated music video was created by Josue Gil Aleman.

Other works 
Since 2010, Serhat is the president of Alumni Association of Istanbul German High School and since 2013 a board member of Istanbul German High School Management Association.

Discography

Albums

Singles

Awards and honours 

 1998: Fair Play Grand Prize by National Olympic Committee of Turkey
 2003: FIDOF (International Federation of Festival Organizations) Annual Golden Transitional Media Ring of Friendship
 2004: Golden Key of the City of Alexandria

References

External links 

Official website of End Productions

Living people
1964 births
Singers from Istanbul
Turkish male singers
Turkish television producers
Turkish television presenters
Turkish pop singers
Turkish dance musicians
Latin music musicians
Disco musicians
Spanish-language singers of Turkey
Turkish composers
Turkish songwriters
Istanbul University alumni
Deutsche Schule Istanbul alumni
Eurovision Song Contest entrants of 2016
Eurovision Song Contest entrants of 2019
Eurovision Song Contest entrants for San Marino
Television people from Istanbul